Distress (French: Détresse) is a 1929 French silent film directed by Jean Durand.

Cast
 Philippe Hériat 
 Maurice Luguet 
 Harry Pilcer 
 Alice Roberts

References

Bibliography
 Rège, Philippe. Encyclopedia of French Film Directors, Volume 1. Scarecrow Press, 2009.

External links 
 

1929 films
French silent films
1920s French-language films
Films directed by Jean Durand
French black-and-white films
1920s French films